General elections are scheduled to be held in Mexico in July 2024. Voters will elect a new president to serve a six-year term, 500 members of the Chamber of Deputies and 128 members of the Senate. The members of the legislature elected on this date will be the first allowed to run for re-election in subsequent elections.

Article 83 of the Mexican Constitution bars incumbent President Andrés Manuel López Obrador from seeking reelection.

Electoral system
The President is elected by first-past-the-post voting.

The 500 members of the Chamber of Deputies are elected by two methods; 300 are elected in single-member constituencies by first-past-the-post voting, with the remaining 200 elected in a single nationwide constituency by proportional representation, with seats allocated using the simple quotient and largest remainder method. No party is allowed to hold more than 300 seats.

The 128 members of the Senate are also elected by two methods, with 96 elected in 32 three-seat constituencies based on the states and 32 elected in a single nationwide constituency by proportional representation. In the three-seat constituencies, two seats are allocated to the party receiving the highest number of votes and one seat to the party receiving the second-highest number of votes.

Potential presidential candidates
Claudia Sheinbaum, head of government of Mexico City, has been proposed as a potential successor to López Obrador, on multiple occasions she has stated that "Mexico is ready to elect a female president" and enjoys the support of high ranking members of the governing MORENA party such as governors Layda Sansores of Campeche and Alfonso Durazo of Sonora. Marcelo Ebrard, current Secretary of Foreign Affairs, former presidential candidate and longtime ally of López Obrador has publicly expressed his interest in being MORENA's candidate in the upcoming election. Adán Augusto López, secretary of the interior and former governor of Tabasco has also expressed his intent to run for the highest office, yet he has maintained a lower profile and enjoys less name recognition. Gerardo Fernández Noroña, a representative from PT, has on multiple occasions expressed his desire to be the standard-bearer for the president's coalition in 2024. Other potential candidates proposed by López Obrador himself include Rosa Icela Rodríguez, Tatiana Clouthier, Juan Ramón de la Fuente, Rocío Nahle, and Esteban Moctezuma.

Potential candidates on the right include PRI's Enrique de la Madrid and Claudia Ruiz Massieu, cabinet members during the presidency of Enrique Peña Nieto, as well as Beatriz Paredes, a PRI senator, Damián Zepeda, former president of PAN, Juan Carlos Romero Hicks, representative from PAN, Santiago Creel, a former senator and Secretary of the Interior from PAN, and Lilly Téllez, former journalist, and now senator from PAN. 

Enrique Alfaro, governor of Jalisco, has expressed his desire to be the candidate of his party, the Movimiento Ciudadano. A candidacy by Luis Donaldo Colosio Riojas, son of former presidential candidate Luis Donaldo Colosio Murrieta, has been floated around by the media.

MORENA and allies

Va por Mexico

Citizens' Movement

Opinion Polls

Polls have been carried out by various organisations and aggregated by the Americas Society – Council of the Americas.

References

External links
Federal Electoral Institute (in Spanish)

Elections in Mexico
Presidential elections in Mexico
Mexico
General